Allison Cameron (born 1963) is a Canadian composer of contemporary classical music. She composes works for conventional classical instruments, early music instruments, and modern electric instruments such as the electric guitar. She is also a performer of free improvisation and experimental music.

Early life and education

Cameron was born in Edmonton, Alberta, and moved with her family to North Vancouver. She studied at the University of Victoria and York University. She has cited Michael Longton and Rudolf Komorous as significant influences.

Career
Cameron moved to Toronto in 1989. She founded a six-piece chamber ensemble, Arcana, in 1992, which performs a contemporary composition repertoire. In 1995 she released a CD of chamber music, Raw Sangudo.

Cameron's 1998 composition, "Retablo", was commissioned through the Canada Council for the Arts to be played by the classical music quartet The Burdocks. Her 2000 release, Ornaments, features her compositions performed by violinist Marc Sabat, pianist Stephen Clarke, and clarinetist Ronda Rindone.

Cameron has worked with Louis Andriessen, Gilius van Bergeijk, Per Nørgård, and Frederic Rzewski in Europe, and Rudolf Komorous, Michael Longton, and James Tenney in Canada. She was a member of the Drystone Orchestra, along with Martin Arnold, Stephen Parkinson, and John Abram. She also performs in a duet with Parkinson.

Her music has been performed at the Bang on a Can Festival and she has been commissioned by the Bang on a Can All-Stars. Recordings of her music have been released by the CRI and XI (Experimental Intermedia) labels.  In 2004, she was music director of the contemporary ensemble Arraymusic.

In 2013, the Allison Cameron Band (Cameron, Eric Chenaux and Parkinson), released an album, Bent Spoon Duo, Without and With Allison Cameron through the Rat Drifting label.

Discography
1995 - Raw Sangudo. CD. Experimental Intermedia.
1998 - Leisure. CD. Maarten Altena Ensemble. Donemus.
2002 - Ornaments. CD. Spool.
2004 - Canevas (Fin Fin). CD. Ensemble SuperMusique. DAME.  
2010 - The Allison Cameron Band. CD. Rat-Drifting.
2012 - Mach Shorn – The EP. Stephen Parkinson, Sandro Perri, Marla Hlady, Christof Migone, Eric Chenaux, Allison Cameron. 
2015 - A-Gossamer-Bit. CD. Redshift Music Society.
Compilations included on:  

 1992 - Bang on a Can Live. Vol. 1. CD. Emergency Music series. New York, New York: CRI. (Contains Two Bits by Allison Cameron.)
 2001 - ArrayMusic Ensemble; compilation CD, Artifact, Toronto.
 2008 - Rains Out. CD, Veni Ensemble Bratislava, Hevhetia.
 2004 - The  Art of Touching The Keyboard CD, Eve Egoyan, Earwitness Records.

References

External links
Allison Cameron page from Canadian Music Centre site
Allison Cameron page at The Living Composers Project site
Allison Cameron page from Kalvos & Damian's New Music Bazaar
 Spool (Record Label)
 Experimental Intermedia
 Allison Cameron's web page

1963 births
Living people
20th-century classical composers
21st-century classical composers
Date of birth missing (living people)
Canadian classical composers
Musicians from Edmonton
Pupils of Louis Andriessen
Canadian women in electronic music
Women classical composers
20th-century Canadian composers
20th-century women composers
21st-century women composers
20th-century Canadian women musicians
21st-century Canadian women musicians
Canadian women composers